Rosemary Clooney Sings Rodgers, Hart & Hammerstein is a 1990 album by Rosemary Clooney, consisting of songs composed by Richard Rodgers, with lyrics by Lorenz Hart, and Oscar Hammerstein II.

Track listing
 "Oh, What a Beautiful Mornin'" – 2:15
 "People Will Say We're in Love" – 4:55
 "Love, Look Away" – 3:46
 "The Gentleman Is a Dope" – 6:07
 "It Might as Well Be Spring" – 2:54
 "The Sweetest Sounds" – 6:22
 "I Could Write a Book" – 	3:10
 "You Took Advantage of Me" – 3:59
 "The Lady Is a Tramp" – 5:58
 "Little Girl Blue" – 4:34
 "My Romance" – 4:01
 "Yours Sincerely" – 3:15

All music composed by Richard Rodgers. Tracks one to five, lyrics by Oscar Hammerstein II, "The Sweetest Sounds", lyrics by Rodgers, tracks seven to twelve, lyrics by Lorenz Hart.

Personnel
 Rosemary Clooney – vocals
 Jack Sheldon – trumpet, vocal (track 2)
 Chauncey Welsch – trombone
 Warren Vaché Jr. – cornet
 Scott Hamilton – tenor saxophone
 John Oddo – piano, vocal and instrumental arrangements
 John Clayton – bass 
 Joe LaBarbera – drums
 The L.A. Jazz Choir – vocals (tracks 1,3,7,10-12)

References

1990 albums
Rosemary Clooney albums
Concord Records albums
Rodgers and Hammerstein